The 1985 Lombard regional election took place on 12 May 1985. The 4th term of the Regional Council was chosen.

Electoral law 
Election was held under proportional representation with provincial constituencies where the largest remainder method with a Droop quota was used. To ensure more proportionality, remained votes and seats were transferred at regional level and calculated at-large.

Results
The Christian Democracy party was by far the largest party, despite a slight decline in term of votes. After the election Giuseppe Guzzetti was re-elected president for the third time at the head of a center-left coalition comprising also the PSI, the PSDI, the PLI and the PRI. In 1986 Guzzetti was replaced by Bruno Tabacci, to whom Giuseppe Giovenzana succeeded in 1989.

Seats by province

1985 elections in Italy
Regional elections in Lombardy